Giuseppe Albani (8 April 1921 – 7 June 1989), popularly known as Peppino, was a professional Italian football player. He was born in Cava Manara in April 1921 and died in June 1989 at the age of 68.

References

External links

1921 births
1989 deaths
Italian footballers
Serie A players
F.C. Pavia players
Inter Milan players
Atalanta B.C. players
Brescia Calcio players
Association football goalkeepers
Sportspeople from Pavia
Footballers from Lombardy
20th-century Italian people